Tantalizers is a leading Nigerian fast food restaurant chain. It opened its first location around 1997 in Festac Town, Lagos. This first location was initially a small neighborhood restaurant serving hamburgers. Success at this first location led to an expansion that has seen the company and its franchisees open additional locations in cities such as Lagos, Ibadan, Abuja, and Port Harcourt. As of 2015, the restaurant has 50 outlets across Nigeria. Tantalizers serves Nigerian fast food staples such as meat pies, scotch eggs, chicken, jollof rice, fried rice, cakes, and hamburgers.

See also
 List of hamburger restaurants

References

External links
 Tantalizers website

Fast-food chains of Nigeria
Fast-food franchises
Restaurants in Lagos
Restaurants established in 1997